Phrynobatrachus gastoni is a species of frog in the family Phrynobatrachidae. It is endemic to the north-central Democratic Republic of the Congo and only known from its type locality, Buta. The specific name gastoni honours Gaston-François de Witte, a Belgian colonial administrator and naturalist who scrutinized the types. Common name Buta river frog has been coined for it.

Description
The overall appearance is stout. The snout is obtusely pointed. The tympanum is visible. The finger and toe tips may be slightly dilated but are not expanded into discs. The fingers have no webbing but the toes have moderate webbing (one-quarter to one-third webbed). The dorsal skin is rugose and warty; the scapular region bears a pair of prominent glands. The ventral skin is smooth. The dorsum is grayish-brown, with slightly darker marbling. There is a lighter transverse band in the interorbital space. The sides of the head and limbs are lighter than the back. The limbs have conspicuous cross bars. The venter is white. The throat has finely stippling of dusky specks, which coalesce to form irregular patches on the lips and a band across the chest.

Habitat and conservation
There is no information in ecology of this species. Threats to it are also unknown.

References

gastoni
Frogs of Africa
Amphibians of the Democratic Republic of the Congo
Endemic fauna of the Democratic Republic of the Congo
Taxa named by Thomas Barbour
Taxa named by Arthur Loveridge
Amphibians described in 1928
Taxonomy articles created by Polbot
Northern Congolian forest–savanna mosaic